Korea National Defense University is a national university located in Nonsan, South Korea.  It was founded in 1955.  It got its current configuration in 2000.  The university was situated in Seoul from its founding until its relocation to Nonsan in 2017.

See also
List of national universities in South Korea
List of universities and colleges in South Korea
Education in Korea

References

External links 
 Official website 
 Official website 

Nonsan
Military academies of South Korea
Universities and colleges in South Chungcheong Province
Educational institutions established in 1955
1955 establishments in South Korea